Stibasoma is a genus of horse flies in the family Tabanidae.

Species
Stibasoma apicimacula Fairchild, 1940
Stibasoma aureoguttatum Kröber, 1931
Stibasoma bella Limeira-de-Oliveira, 2005
Stibasoma bicolor Bigot, 1892
Stibasoma bifenestrata Philip, 1966
Stibasoma chionostigma (Osten Sacken, 1886)
Stibasoma currani Philip, 1943
Stibasoma festivum (Wiedemann, 1828)
Stibasoma flaviventre (Macquart, 1848)
Stibasoma fulvohirtum (Wiedemann, 1828)
Stibasoma giganteum (Lutz, 1913)
Stibasoma leucopleurale Barretto, 1947
Stibasoma lutzi Barretto, 1947
Stibasoma manauensis Turcatel, Rafael & Carvalho, 2020
Stibasoma ruthae Turcatel, Rafael & Carvalho, 2020
Stibasoma sulfurotaenium Kröber, 1931
Stibasoma theotaenia (Wiedemann, 1828)
Stibasoma willistoni Lutz, 1907

References

Tabanidae
Brachycera genera
Diptera of North America
Diptera of South America
Taxa named by Ignaz Rudolph Schiner